Sotomayor is a Galician surname. Notable people with the surname include:

 Sonia Sotomayor, U.S. Supreme Court justice

In arts and entertainment
 Carlos Sotomayor (1911–1988), Chilean painter
 Chris Sotomayor, artist who works as a colorist in the comics industry
 Fernando Álvarez de Sotomayor y Zaragoza, Galician painter, (1875–1960)
 Liesel Holler Sotomayor, Miss Peru 2004
 Michael Hennet Sotomayor (born 1983), member of the boyband D'NASH
 Tommy Sotomayor (born 1975), American radio show host and YouTube personality

In sports
 Javier Sotomayor (born 1967), Cuban high jumper
 Víctor Sotomayor (born 1968), retired Argentine football player
Nelson Piquet Souto Maior (born 1952), retired Brazilian Formula One World Champion

In other fields
 Martín Álvarez de Sotomayor (1723–1819), Viceroy of Navarre between 1788 and 1790
 Sonia Sotomayor (born 1954), U.S. Supreme Court justice
 Sylvia Sotomayor, creator of Kēlen, a constructed language

See also
 Soutomaior, a municipality in Galicia, Spain
 Souto Maior (disambiguation)

Spanish-language surnames